Thomas Larkin (born 31 December 1990) is a British-born Italian ice hockey defenceman. He is currently playing with Adler Mannheim of the Deutsche Eishockey Liga (DEL). Larkin was selected by the Columbus Blue Jackets in the 5th round (137th overall) of the 2009 NHL Entry Draft, the first Italian-trained player ever selected in the NHL Entry Draft. Larkin attended Phillips Exeter Academy and then spent four years at Colgate University, where he played for the Raiders ice hockey team, and served as the team's co-captain during his senior season. Internationally, Larkin has represented Italy at the world championships.

Playing career
In Larkin's final season at Phillips Exeter Academy he set a school record for most goals and assists by a defenceman in one season (14 and 38, respectively). He also had the school record for most career points by a defenceman (82). Prior to the 2009 NHL Entry Draft Larkin was ranked 87th overall amongst North American skaters by the NHL Central Scouting Bureau. This was an improvement of 59 spots from his place three months prior. He was selected in the fifth round, 137th overall by the Columbus Blue Jackets, becoming the first Italian-trained player ever chosen in the NHL Entry Draft.

Larkin had an impressive freshman season at Colgate University, playing in 33 games and registering 19 points with 32 minutes in penalties, but his production fell to just 11 points in 41 games played during his sophomore 2010–11 season. Upon completion of his collegiate career, on 5 July 2013, Larkin was signed to a two-year entry level contract by the Columbus Blue Jackets.

At the conclusion of his entry-level contract with the Blue Jackets, Larkin was not tendered a new offer and was released to free agency. On 22 August 2015, Larkin signed his first professional European contract, agreeing to a one-year contract with Croatian KHL participants Medveščak Zagreb. He eventually played for the Zagreb team until 16 February 2017 and then was picked up by Adler Mannheim of the German DEL.

On 7 November 2017, Larkin hit Daniel Paille during a match between Swedish club Brynas and Adler Mannheim, resulting in Paille leaving with a severe concussion. Two days after the incident, Larkin apologized on Twitter, writing:

"It wasn’t my intention to cause an injury. I wanted to put pressure on the puck carrier behind the net. I would like to apologize to Daniel Paille and I hope he is back playing soon."

A year later on 29 November 2018, Swedish prosecutor Joakim Johansson indicated that Larkin would be charged with assault for blindsiding Paille.

In the 2018-19 campaign, Larkin captured the German championship with Mannheim, scoring the game winner in overtime of game five in the finals against Munich.

International play
Larkin competed at the 2011 IIHF World Championship Division I, 2012 IIHF World Championship and 2014 IIHF World Championship as a member of the Italy national ice hockey team.

Personal life
Larkin was born in London but grew up in Cocquio-Trevisago, Italy. His father is from Boston, Massachusetts while his mother is from Milan, Italy. When Larkin was four his family moved to Italy; it was there, at age 7, that he first began to play hockey, joining his older brother at the HC Varese's rink. Larkin speaks five languages (English, Italian, French, Spanish and German).

Career statistics

Regular season and playoffs

International

Awards and honors

References

External links

1990 births
Adler Mannheim players
Alumni of the European Schools
Colgate Raiders men's ice hockey players
Columbus Blue Jackets draft picks
Evansville IceMen players
Italian ice hockey defencemen
English people of Italian descent
Living people
KHL Medveščak Zagreb players
Sportspeople from the Province of Varese
Phillips Exeter Academy alumni
Springfield Falcons players